Adventures of a Dentist is a 1965 Soviet dark comedy/drama feature film directed by Elem Klimov on Mosfilm.  It is currently available to view through the Criterion Channel, and is occasionally screened at film festivals.

Plot
A dentist is derided (and eventually has his life ruined) by his colleagues for his natural talent of painlessly pulling out teeth.

Cast
Andrey Myagkov as Sergey Petrovich Chesnokov
Vera Vasilyeva as Lyudmila Ivanovna Lastochkina
Alisa Freindlich as Masha
Panteleymon Krymov as father of Masha
Olga Gobzeva as Tanya
Igor Kvasha as Merezhkovsky, a fighter for justice
Valentin Nikulin as a sick man, brought for a "demonstrative" tooth extraction
Yevgeniy Perov as Yakov Vasilyevich Rubakhin
Andrei Petrov as Kotikov, Chesnokov's boss
Leonid Diachkov as fiancé of Masha
Elizaveta Nikischihina as student Zavalniuk
Lybov Korneva as Karpova, medical student
Svetlana Starikova as Komsomol leader

Production 
The film was shot in Kaluga on Dostoevsky Street, Bauman Street, Pushkin Street, Stary Torg Square, Assumption Church.

Background
The film's implication, that society inevitably ostracizes those who are gifted, horrified censors who told Klimov to change it. When Klimov refused, the film was given the lowest classification: "category three", which meant that it was shown in only 25-78 movie theatres.  Only about half a million viewers saw the film when it premiered.  In the West, the film has gained recognition due to it being directed by Klimov (most known for his film Come and See), and it has been screened at several film festivals in the last few years.

References

External links

An overview of Elem Klimov's career at kinoeye.org

1965 films
1965 in the Soviet Union
Russian black comedy films
1965 comedy-drama films
Films about dentistry
Films directed by Elem Klimov
Films scored by Alfred Schnittke
Soviet comedy-drama films
1960s Russian-language films
Soviet black comedy films
Mosfilm films
Censorship in the Soviet Union
Russian comedy-drama films
Soviet black-and-white films
1960s black comedy films
Russian black-and-white films